Tengizchevroil is a joint venture between Chevron (50% share in the consortium), ExxonMobil (25% share), KazMunayGas (20% share) and LukArco (5% share). The joint venture was formed in April 1993, when the government of Kazakhstan granted exclusive 40-year rights to Tengizchevroil LLP (TCO) to develop the Tengiz and Korolevskoye oil fields located in the north-eastern reaches of the Caspian Sea in Kazakhstan.

History and operations 

From a two-company joint venture in 1993 (between the Kazakhstani state oil company KazakhOil, now KazMunayGas, and the American oil giant Chevron) Tengizchevroil expanded in 1996–1997 into a four-company consortium: ExxonMobil Kazakhstan Ventures, an ExxonMobil subsidiary, and LukArco, a joint venture between Lukoil and Atlantic Richfield (ARCO), acquired 25% and 5% respectively. In 2000, BP became involved in the business, as BP had merged with Arco and took a 46% share in LukArco. In December 2009, BP sold its stake to Lukoil and thereafter Lukoil became the sole shareholder of LukArco.

In mid-2019, BP expressed interest in returning to Kazakhstan. The company signed a memorandum of understanding with KazMunayGas. In 2020, the companies signed an agreement establishing a partnership to explore for hydrocarbons in Kazakhstan.

In January 2014, the firm reported a record rise in output to 27.1 million tonnes from 24.2 million tonnes.

References

External links

 Official website (in English)
 Tengiz expansion – Chevron Corporation
 ‘When there’s a challenge, we face it head on’ - Interview by Alexander Cornelius, CEO of TengizChevroil, by United World. 27 April 2006

Oil and gas companies of Kazakhstan
Joint ventures
Companies established in 1993
ARCO
ExxonMobil subsidiaries
Chevron Corporation
Lukoil